Noctuites is a genus of extinct moths in the Noctuoidea superfamily. This genus was originally designated to accommodate noctuids of uncertain association. Most noctuoid fossils are incomplete, making them hard to place in a modern phylogeny of Noctuoidea. For this reason the genus has not been assigned to a family.

Species
†Noctuites caucasicus Kozlov, 1988, described from the Stavropol Territory of Russia and dated to the Middle Miocene.
†Noctuites deperditus Heer, 1856, described from Aix-en-Provence in France and dated to the Late Oligocene–Early Miocene boundary.
†Noctuites effosus Heer, 1849 (= Noctuites effossus Handlirsch, 1908), described from Croatia and dated to the Early Miocene.
†Noctuites gersdorfi Kernbach, 1967, described from Germany and dated to the Late Pliocene.
†Noctuites haidingeri Heer, 1849, described from Croatia and dated to the Early Miocene.
†Noctuites incertissimus Oustalet, 1870, described from France and dated to the Late Oligocene.
†Noctuites kaspievi Kozlov, 1988, described from the Stavropol Territory of Russia and dated to the Middle Miocene.
†Noctuites kozhantshikovi Kozlov, 1988, described from the Stavropol Territory of Russia and dated to the Middle Miocene.
†Noctuites kusnezovi Kozlov, 1988, described from the Stavropol Territory of Russia and dated to the Middle Miocene.
†Noctuites maximus Kozlov, 1988, described from the Stavropol Territory of Russia and dated to the Middle Miocene.
†Noctuites miocenicus (Kozhanchikov, 1957) (described as Xyleutites miocenicus), described from the Stavropol Territory of Russia and dated to the Middle Miocene.
†Noctuites radobojana Kozlov, 1988, described from Croatia and dated to the Early Miocene.
†Noctuites stavropolicus Kozlov, 1988, described from the Stavropol Territory of Russia and dated to the Middle Miocene.

Unnamed fossils
A further three unnamed fossil species have been assigned to this genus:
Undescribed species Hope, 1836 (originally referred to Noctua)
Undescribed species Kozlov, 1988, from the Stavropol Territory of Russia and dated to the Middle Miocene.
Undescribed species Lomnicki, 1894 (originally referred to Noctua), from Ukraine and dated to the Pleistocene.

References
Sohn, J.-C. et al. 2012: An annotated catalog of fossil and subfossil Lepidoptera (Insecta: Holometabola) of the world. Zootaxa, 3286: 1-132

Fossil Lepidoptera
†
Miocene insects
Prehistoric insects of Europe
Fossil taxa described in 1849